The Ostrog Bible was one of the earliest East Slavic translations of the Bible and the first complete printed edition of the Bible in Church Slavonic, published in Ostroh, in the Polish–Lithuanian Commonwealth (modern territory of Ukraine), by the printer Ivan Fyodorov in 1581 with the assistance of the Ruthenian Prince Konstantin Ostrogski.

The Ostrog Bible was translated not from the (Hebrew) Masoretic text, but from the (Greek) Septuagint. This translation comprised seventy-six books of the Old and New Testaments and a manuscript of the Codex Alexandrinus. Some parts were based on Francysk Skaryna's translations.

The Ostrog Bibles were printed on two dates: 12 July 1580, and 12 August 1581. The second version differs from the 1580 original in composition, ornamentation, and correction of misprints. In the printing of the Bible, delays occurred, as it was necessary to remove mistakes, to search for correct textual resolutions of questions, and to produce a correct translation. The editing of the Bible detained printing. In the meantime, Fyodorov and his company printed other biblical books. The first were those that did not require correcting: the Psalter and the New Testament.

The Ostrog Bible is a monumental publication of 1,256 pages, lavishly decorated with headpieces and initials, which were prepared especially for it. From the typographical point of view, the Ostrog Bible is irreproachable. This is the first Bible printed in Cyrillic type. It served as the original and model for further Russian publications of the Bible.

The importance of the first printed Cyrillic Bible can hardly be overestimated. Prince Ostrogski sent copies to Pope Gregory XIII and tsar Ivan the Terrible, while the latter presented a copy to an English ambassador. When leaving Ostroh, Fyodorov took 400 books with him. Only 300 copies of the Ostrog Bible are extant today.

The Ostrog Bible was widely known in Ukraine, Russia, and Belarus, and also abroad. It is registered in the library of Oxford; its copies were owned by King Gustavus Adolphus of Sweden, the cardinal Barberini, many scientists and the public figures of that time. The Ostrog Bible was reprinted in Moscow in 1663.

The significance of the Ostrog Bible was enormous for Orthodox education, which had to resist strong Catholic pressure in Ukraine and Belarus.

References 

1663 Reprint of The Ostrog Bible [revised by Arsenios the Greek, Zakariya Afanas'ev and two others, under the direction of the Patriarch Nikon] Reprint

External links 

 The Ostrog Circle and Bible from Ways of Russian Theology, by Fr. George Florovsky
 Ostrih Bible at the Encyclopedia of Ukraine

Early printed Bibles
Individual Bibles
Cultural history of Ukraine
Ukrainian literature
History of Christianity in Ukraine
1581 books
Bible translations into Church Slavonic
East Slavic manuscripts
16th century in Ukraine